Trinity Common Mall (often referred to by residents as "Trinity") is a large outdoor shopping centre in the city of Brampton, Ontario, Canada. Phase one of the mall opened in the fall of 1999 and phase two was completed in the summer of 2004.

Trinity Common Mall is located on the northeast corner of Highway 410 and Bovaird Drive and is served by Brampton Transit and GO Transit.

Anchors
 Canadian Tire
 The Home Depot
 HomeSense
 Metro
 Sport Chek
 Staples
 SilverCity

Transit terminal

References

Buildings and structures in Brampton
Shopping malls in the Regional Municipality of Peel
Shopping malls established in 1999
1999 establishments in Ontario
Tourist attractions in Brampton